Mozhaysky (masculine), Mozhayskaya (feminine), or Mozhayskoye (neuter) is the name of several rural localities in Russia:
Mozhayskoye, Belgorod Oblast, a selo in Novooskolsky District of Belgorod Oblast
Mozhayskoye, Vologda Oblast, a settlement in Spassky Selsoviet of Vologodsky District of Vologda Oblast
Mozhayskoye, Voronezh Oblast, a selo in Mozhayskoye Rural Settlement of Kashirsky District of Voronezh Oblast